This is a list of broadcast television stations that are licensed in the territory of American Samoa.

Full-power stations
VC refers to the station's PSIP virtual channel. RF refers to the station's physical RF channel.

KVZK-TV previously operated analog stations on channels 8, 10 and 12 prior to 1974.

LPTV stations

A station that had a construction permit but never made it to air, K34HI, would have carried Fox programming.

American Samoa

Television stations